27th Street station  is a commuter rail station in the Douglas neighborhood of Chicago that serves the Metra Electric Line north to Millennium Station and south to University Park, Blue Island, and South Chicago. As of 2018, 27th Street is Metra's least-used station, with an average of 12 weekday boardings. 27th Street is a flag stop; trains will not stop unless a passenger is waiting on the platform or a passenger notifies a conductor.

The station was originally built by the Illinois Central Railroad (ICRR). It directly served Michael Reese Hospital until the hospital closed in 2008. In 1972 it was the site of Chicago's worst rail disaster, the Illinois Central commuter rail crash.

Connections 
CTA buses
 3 King Drive
21 Cermak

References

External links 

27th Street entrance from Google Maps Street View

Former Illinois Central Railroad stations
Metra stations in Chicago